Two ships of the Royal Navy have been named HMS Blyth

  - a  launched on 2 September 1940, placed in reserve in 1946 and sold in 1948. She was renamed Radbourne and served as a ferry until being broken up in November 1952.
  -  is the eleventh , launched in 2000 and decommissioned in 2021.

Battle honours
Ships named Blyth have earned the following battle honours:
 Dieppe 1942
 North Sea 1942
 English Channel 1943
 Normandy 1944
 Al Faw 2003

References

Royal Navy ship names